Rutger Backe (born 14 January 1951 in Falkenberg) is a Swedish former football player and coach. He started his career in local club IF Böljan. He joined Allsvenskan club Halmstads BK in 1972, with whom he played until 1981. Backe played 207 matches in the top league, scoring 77 goals. He was the Allsvenskan top scorer with 21 goals, when the club won its first ever Swedish national championship in 1976. Backe played 8 matches with the Swedish national team, scoring two goals. He trained Varbergs BoIS and Falkenbergs FF in the 1990s.

References 

1951 births
Swedish footballers
Sweden international footballers
Allsvenskan players
Halmstads BK players
Living people
Swedish football managers
Falkenbergs FF managers
People from Falkenberg
Association football forwards
Sportspeople from Halland County